Odesa Oblast is subdivided into districts (raions) which are subdivided into territorial communities (hromadas).

Current

On 18 July 2020, the number of districts was reduced from 31 to seven (now incorporating also the 5 formerly separate city municipalities). These are:
 Berezivka (Березівський район), the center is in the city of Berezivka;
 Bilhorod-Dnistrovskyi (Білгород-Дністровський район), the center is in the city of Bilhorod-Dnistrovskyi; 
 Bolhrad (Болградський район), the center is in the city of Bolhrad;
 Izmail (Ізмаїльський район), the center is in the city of Izmail;
 Odesa (Одеський район), the center is in the city of Odesa;
 Podilsk (Подільський район), the center is in the city of Podilsk;
 Rozdilna (Роздільнянський район), the center is in the city of Rozdilna.

Administrative divisions until 2020

Before July 2020, Odesa Oblast was subdivided into 31 regions: 26 districts (raions) and 5 city municipalities (mis'krada or misto), officially known as territories governed by city councils.

Cities under the oblast's jurisdiction:
Odesa (Одеса), the administrative center of the oblast
Balta  Municipality
Cities  under the city's jurisdiction:
Balta (Балта)
Bilhorod-Dnistrovskyi Municipality 
Cities  under the city's jurisdiction:
Bilhorod-Dnistrovskyi (Білгород-Дністровський)
Urban-type settlements under the city's jurisdiction:
Serhiivka (Сергіївка)
Zatoka (Затока)
Biliaivka Municipality
Cities  under the city's jurisdiction:
Biliaivka (Біляївка)
Illichivsk Municipality
Cities under the city's jurisdiction:
Chornomorsk (Чорноморськ), formerly Illichivsk
Urban-type settlements under the city's jurisdiction:
Oleksandrivka (Олександрівка)
Izmail (Ізмаїл)
Podilsk (Подільськ), formerly Kotovsk
Teplodar (Теплодар)
Yuzhne (Южне)
Districts (raions):
Ananiv (Ананьївський район)
Cities under the district's jurisdiction:
Ananiv (Ананьїв)
Artsyz (Арцизький район)
Cities under the district's jurisdiction:
Artsyz (Арциз)
Balta (Балтський район)
Berezivka (Березівський район)
Cities under the district's jurisdiction:
Berezivka (Березівка)
Urban-type settlements under the district's jurisdiction:
Raukhivka (Раухівка)
Bilhorod-Dnistrovskyi (Білгород-Дністровський район)
Biliaivka (Біляївський район)
Urban-type settlements under the district's jurisdiction:
Khlibodarske (Хлібодарське)
Bolhrad (Болградський район)
Cities under the district's jurisdiction:
Bolhrad (Болград)
Ivanivka (Іванівський район)
Urban-type settlements under the district's jurisdiction:
Ivanivka (Іванівка)
Petrivka (Петрівка)
Radisne (Радісне)
Izmail (Ізмаїльський район)
Urban-type settlements under the district's jurisdiction:
Suvorove (Суворове)
Kiliia (Кілійський район)
Cities under the district's jurisdiction:
Kiliia (Кілія)
Vylkove (Вилкове)
Kodyma (Кодимський район)
Cities under the district's jurisdiction:
Kodyma (Кодима)
Urban-type settlements under the district's jurisdiction:
Slobidka (Слобідка)
Liubashivka (Любашівський район)
Urban-type settlements under the district's jurisdiction:
Liubashivka (Любашівка)
Zelenohirske (Зеленогірське)
Lyman (Лиманський район), formerly Kominternivske Raion
Urban-type settlements under the district's jurisdiction:
Chornomorske (Чорноморське)
Dobroslav (Доброслав), formerly Kominternivske
Novi Biliari (Нові Білярі)
Mykolaivka (Миколаївський район)
Urban-type settlements under the district's jurisdiction:
Mykolaivka (Миколаївка)
Okny (Окнянський район), formerly Krasni Okny Raion
Urban-type settlements under the district's jurisdiction:
Okny (Окни), formerly Krasni Okny
Ovidiopol (Овідіопольський район)
Urban-type settlements under the district's jurisdiction:
Avanhard (Авангард)
Ovidiopol (Овідіополь)
Tairove (Таїрове)
Velykodolynske (Великодолинське)
Podilsk (Подільськ район), formerly Kotovsk Raion
Reni (Ренійський район)
Cities under the district's jurisdiction:
Reni (Рені)
Rozdilna (Роздільнянський район)
Cities under the district's jurisdiction:
Rozdilna (Роздільна)
Urban-type settlements under the district's jurisdiction:
Lymanske (Лиманське)
Sarata (Саратський район)
Urban-type settlements under the district's jurisdiction:
Sarata (Сарата)
Savran (Савранський район)
Urban-type settlements under the district's jurisdiction:
Savran (Саврань)
Shyriaieve (Ширяївський район)
Urban-type settlements under the district's jurisdiction:
Shyriaieve (Ширяєве)
Tarutyne (Тарутинський район)
Urban-type settlements under the district's jurisdiction:
Berezyne (Березине)
Borodino (Бородіно)
Serpneve (Серпневе)
Tarutyne (Тарутине)
Tatarbunary (Татарбунарський район)
Cities under the district's jurisdiction:
Tatarbunary (Татарбунари)
Velyka Mykhailivka (Великомихайлівський район)
Urban-type settlements under the district's jurisdiction:
Tsebrykove (Цебрикове)
Velyka Mykhailivka (Велика Михайлівка)
Zakharivka (Захарівський район), formerly Frunzivka Raion
Urban-type settlements under the district's jurisdiction:
Zakharivka (Захарівка), formerly Frunzivka
Zatyshshia (Затишшя)

References

Odessa
Odesa Oblast